Cypripedium fasciculatum, the clustered lady's slipper, is a member of the orchid genus Cypripedium. Members of this genus are commonly referred to as lady's slippers. C. fasciculatum, along with C. montanum and C. californicum, are the only members of the genus Cypripedium that are endemic to western North America.

Description
Up to four flowers hang from a drooping stem, sometimes resting on the leaves or even on the ground. The petals and sepals are green to purplish-brown while the pouch is yellowish-green with purple streaking near the opening.

Range
C. fasciculatum is found in the western United States in Washington, Oregon, California, Colorado, Montana, Idaho, Utah, and Wyoming. It is usually found in cool, open coniferous forests, mostly in the mountains.

References

 Phillip Cribb & Peter Green (1997). The Genus Cypripedium (a botanical monograph). Kew Royal Botanic Gardens, Timber Press 

fasciculatum
Endemic orchids of the United States
Flora of the Northwestern United States
Flora of the Southwestern United States
Plants described in 1882